Beatrix "Trixi" Worrack (born 28 September 1981) is a German former professional road racing cyclist, who rode professionally between 2000 and 2021. The winner of the 2003 German National Road Race Championships, Worrack's career highlights included winning the 2005 Primavera Rosa (the women's Milan–San Remo), capturing the overall title at the 2004 Tour de l'Aude Cycliste Féminin and competing in the women's road race at five Summer Olympic Games between 2004 and 2020.

Prior to announcing her retirement in 2021, Worrack took a total of 47 wins during her career, including the general classification at the Tour of California, and the Tour of Qatar, stages of the Giro d'Italia Femminile and the Holland Ladies Tour, and she also placed second in the inaugural Tour of Flanders for Women in 2004. In addition she was part of five women's team time trial world championship winning squads. She spent the earlier part of her career as a team leader before shifting towards a role as a domestique and road captain in later years.

Career
Born in Cottbus, Worrack took up the sport as a teenager, and after a couple of years with her first club competed at the 1998 UCI Road World Championships in Valkenburg aan de Geul, where she won the gold in the junior time trial. In 2006, Worrack was selected as the German women's cyclist of the year.

In November 2015 she was announced as part of the  team's inaugural squad for the 2016 season. In the 2016 edition of the Trofeo Alfredo Binda-Comune di Cittiglio, she suffered a ruptured kidney in a crash, leading to the kidney being removed. However she was able to return to competition and won the German National Time Trial Championships in June. She went on to compete for Germany at the 2016 Summer Olympics where she finished 43rd in the women's road race.

Worrack competed in her final professional race in October 2021 at The Women's Tour, having initially planned to leave the women's peloton after the inaugural running of the Paris–Roubaix Femmes a few days earlier. She had to postpone her final race by a few days due to injuries sustained by several of her  team-mates.

Major results
Source: 

1998
 1st  Time trial, UCI Junior Road World Championships
1999
 UCI Junior Road World Championships
2nd  Road race
3rd  Time trial
2000
 9th Overall Holland Ladies Tour
2001
 1st  Overall Vuelta a Mallorca de Feminas
 1st Stage 7 Women's Challenge
 1st Stage 4 Tour de Suisse Féminin
 3rd Overall Thüringen Rundfahrt der Frauen
 3rd La Flèche Wallonne Féminine
 5th Rund um die Nürnberger Altstadt
2002
 2nd Time trial, National Road Championships
 2nd Overall Tour de Feminin-O cenu Českého Švýcarska
 5th Overall Thüringen Rundfahrt der Frauen
1st Stage 2
2003
 1st  Road race, National Road Championships
 2nd Overall Holland Ladies Tour
 5th Overall Tour de l'Aude Cycliste Féminin
1st Young rider classification
 7th Overall Gracia–Orlová
 10th La Flèche Wallonne Féminine
2004
 1st  Overall Tour de l'Aude Cycliste Féminin
1st Young rider classification
1st Stages 3 & 8b
 1st Overall Tour de Feminin-O cenu Českého Švýcarska
 1st  Overall Giro della Toscana Int. Femminile – Memorial Michela Fanini
 2nd Time trial, National Road Championships
 2nd Overall Holland Ladies Tour
1st Stage 4
 2nd Tour of Flanders for Women
 4th Road race, UCI Road World Championships
 7th La Flèche Wallonne Féminine
 8th Overall Gracia–Orlová
1st Stage 1
2005
 1st Primavera Rosa
 2nd Time trial, National Road Championships
 2nd Overall Tour de l'Aude Cycliste Féminin
1st Stage 9
 2nd Overall Emakumeen Bira
1st Stages 3b & 4
 9th Overall Thüringen Rundfahrt der Frauen
 10th Road race, UCI Road World Championships
2006
 UCI Road World Championships
2nd  Road race
9th Time trial
 2nd Overall Novilon Damesronde van Drenthe
 2nd Overall Tour du Grand Montréal
 2nd Overall Holland Ladies Tour
 3rd Overall Women's Tour of New Zealand
 3rd Overall Tour de l'Aude Cycliste Féminin
 3rd Overall Thüringen Rundfahrt der Frauen
 3rd La Flèche Wallonne Féminine
 4th Open de Suède Vårgårda
 5th Coupe du Monde Cycliste Féminine de Montréal
 7th Sparkassen Giro
 8th Grand Prix de Dottignies
 9th Overall Giro del Trentino Alto Adige-Südtirol
 10th Tour de Berne
 10th Lowland International Rotterdam Tour
2007
 2nd Overall Tour de l'Aude Cycliste Féminin
1st Stage 8b
 2nd Overall Tour du Grand Montréal
 4th Overall Holland Ladies Tour
 4th Tour of Flanders for Women
 6th Overall Thüringen Rundfahrt der Frauen
1st Stage 5b
 8th Australia World Cup
 8th Coupe du Monde Cycliste Féminine de Montréal
 9th Drentse 8 van Dwingeloo
2008
 2nd Overall Tour de Feminin-O cenu Českého Švýcarska
 2nd Overall Thüringen Rundfahrt der Frauen
1st Stage 6
 2nd Overall Giro della Toscana Int. Femminile – Memorial Michela Fanini
 3rd Overall Tour de l'Aude Cycliste Féminin
 4th Overall Iurreta-Emakumeen Bira
 5th Road race, UCI Road World Championships
 5th Overall Women's Tour of New Zealand
 6th Overall Holland Ladies Tour
1st Stage 2 (ITT)
 8th Overall Giro del Trentino Alto Adige-Südtirol
 10th Trofeo Alfredo Binda-Comune di Cittiglio
2009
 1st  Time trial, National Road Championships
 1st Overall Gracia–Orlová
 1st Stage 8 Giro d'Italia Femminile
 2nd Overall Tour de l'Aude Cycliste Féminin
1st Stage 6
 2nd Overall Tour du Grand Montréal
 2nd Grand Prix de Dottignies
 2nd Novilon Eurocup Ronde van Drenthe
 3rd Tour de Berne
 3rd Coupe du Monde Cycliste Féminine de Montréal
 4th Overall Thüringen Rundfahrt der Frauen
 4th Liberty Classic
 6th Overall Holland Ladies Tour
 7th Open de Suède Vårgårda
 10th Overall Giro del Trentino Alto Adige-Südtirol
 10th Drentse 8 van Dwingeloo
2010
 1st Overall Tour de Feminin-O cenu Českého Švýcarska
1st Points classification
1st Stages 1, 2, 3 (ITT), 4 & 5
 3rd Road race, National Road Championships
 5th Liberty Classic
 6th Overall Giro del Trentino Alto Adige-Südtirol
 6th Overall Thüringen Rundfahrt der Frauen
 7th Road race, UCI Road World Championships
 8th Overall Holland Ladies Tour
 10th Overall Tour de l'Aude Cycliste Féminin
2011
 1st Stage 6 Giro della Toscana Int. Femminile – Memorial Michela Fanini
 2nd Open de Suède Vårgårda TTT
 4th Overall Trophée d'Or Féminin
 5th Overall Iurreta-Emakumeen Bira
 5th Durango-Durango Emakumeen Saria
2012
 UCI Road World Championships
1st  Team time trial (with Ellen van Dijk, Charlotte Becker, Amber Neben, Evelyn Stevens and Ina-Yoko Teutenberg)
8th Time trial
 1st Open de Suède Vårgårda TTT
 National Road Championships
2nd Time trial
3rd Road race
 2nd Overall Ladies Tour of Qatar
1st Stage 2
 2nd Overall Gracia-Orlová
1st Stage 3
 2nd Overall Thüringen Rundfahrt der Frauen
1st Stages 3 & 4 (ITT)
 3rd Omloop Het Nieuwsblad
 3rd Le Samyn des Dames
 3rd Trofeo Alfredo Binda-Comune di Cittiglio
 4th Overall Energiewacht Tour
1st Stage 4b (TTT)
 4th Overall Holland Ladies Tour
1st Stage 2 (TTT)
 5th Ronde van Drenthe
 5th Open de Suède Vårgårda
 7th Overall Emakumeen Euskal Bira
 8th GP de Plouay – Bretagne
 9th Time trial, Olympic Games
 10th Novilon Euregio Cup
2013
 UCI Road World Championships
1st  Team time trial (with Ellen van Dijk, Carmen Small, Evelyn Stevens, Katie Colclough and Lisa Brennauer)
5th Time trial
 National Road Championships
1st  Road race
2nd Time trial
 1st Open de Suède Vårgårda TTT
 1st Stage 1 (TTT) Belgium Tour
 2nd Classica Citta di Padova
 5th Overall Ladies Tour of Qatar
 6th Overall Holland Ladies Tour
1st Stage 2 (TTT)
 10th Omloop van het Hageland
2014
 UCI Road World Championships
1st  Team time trial
10th Time trial
 1st Open de Suède Vårgårda TTT
 National Road Championships
2nd Time trial
2nd Road race
 3rd Overall Energiewacht Tour
 3rd Overall Auensteiner-Radsporttage
 5th Overall Ladies Tour of Qatar
 5th GP Comune di Cornaredo
 7th Drentse 8 van Dwingeloo
 9th Durango-Durango Emakumeen Saria
2015
 UCI Road World Championships
1st  Team time trial
10th Time trial
 National Road Championships
1st  Road race
3rd Time trial
 1st  Overall Tour of California
 2nd Overall Energiewacht Tour
1st Stage 2a (TTT)
 2nd Overall Gracia–Orlová
 2nd Crescent Women World Cup Vårgårda TTT
 4th Overall Ladies Tour of Qatar
 9th Overall Holland Ladies Tour
 9th Omloop Het Nieuwsblad
2016
 1st  Time trial, National Road Championships
 1st  Overall Tour of Qatar
 UCI Road World Championships
2nd  Team time trial
7th Time trial
 3rd Ronde van Drenthe
2017
 1st  Time trial, National Road Championships
 3rd Crescent Vårgårda UCI Women's WorldTour TTT
 4th Overall Thüringen Rundfahrt der Frauen
 10th 947 Cycle Challenge
2018
 1st  Team time trial, UCI Road World Championships
 2nd Time trial, National Road Championships
 3rd  Time trial, UEC European Road Championships
 4th Overall BeNe Ladies Tour
1st Stage 2b (ITT)
 7th Overall Healthy Ageing Tour
2019
 1st Postnord UCI WWT Vårgårda West Sweden TTT

References

External links

  
 

1981 births
Living people
German female cyclists
Olympic cyclists of Germany
Cyclists at the 2004 Summer Olympics
Cyclists at the 2008 Summer Olympics
Cyclists at the 2012 Summer Olympics
Cyclists at the 2016 Summer Olympics
Cyclists at the 2020 Summer Olympics
Sportspeople from Cottbus
UCI Road World Champions (women)
Cyclists from Brandenburg
People from Bezirk Cottbus
20th-century German women
21st-century German women